Aulus Atilius Serranus was a Roman consul in the year 170 BCE, together with Aulus Hostilius Mancinus.

Atilius Serranus began as praetor urbanus in 173 BCE. He was instructed to renew the alliance with Antiochus IV. The next year, he was charged with ensuring that a part of the Roman army in Brundusium was successfully moved to Macedonia in support of the Third Macedonian War by consul Gaius Popillius Laenas. After this, he was appointed consul in 170 BCE.

References

2nd-century BC Roman consuls
Roman Republican praetors
Serranus, Aulus